Wave Hill is an estate and garden in New York.

Wave Hill may also refer to:

Kalkarindji, formerly known as Wave Hill Welfare Settlement, a community in Australia
Wave Hill Station, a pastoral lease in Australia.
Wave Hill Walk-off, a 1966 strike at Wave Hill  Station